(male, abbreviated as ),  (his wife, abbreviated as , literally "free lord" or "free lady") and  (his unmarried daughters and maiden aunts) are designations used as titles of nobility in the German-speaking areas of the Holy Roman Empire and in its various successor states, including Austria, Prussia, Bavaria, Liechtenstein, Luxembourg, etc. The title superseded the earlier medieval form, .

It corresponds approximately to the English baron in rank. The Duden orthography of the German language references the French nobility title of Baron, deriving from the latin-germanic combination liber baro (which also means "free lord"), as corresponding to the German "Freiherr"; and that Baron is a corresponding salutation for a Freiherr.

in the feudal system
The title  derives from the historical situation in which an owner held free (allodial) title to his land, as opposed "unmittelbar" ("unintermediated"), or held without any intermediate feudal tenure; or unlike the ordinary baron, who was originally a knight in vassalage to a higher lord or sovereign, and unlike medieval German ministerials, who were bound to provide administrative services for a lord. A  sometimes exercised hereditary administrative and judicial prerogatives over those resident in his barony instead of the liege lord, who might be the duke or count.

Freiherr vs. Baron

When in 1919 privileges to members of dynastic and noble families were abolished by the constitution of the Weimar Republic and hence titles became part of the last name some members of the affected families chose to be officially named  while others preferred  to emphasize their Baltic-German heritage. This is why members of the same family can have different official last names.

The original distinction from other barons was that a s landed property was allodial instead of a fief.

Barons who received their title from the Holy Roman Emperor are sometimes known as "Barons of the Holy Roman Empire", in order to distinguish them from other barons, although the title as such was simply . After the dissolution of the Holy Roman Empire in 1806,   did not belong to the noble hierarchy of any realm, but by a decision of the Congress of Vienna in 1815, their titles were nonetheless officially recognised. From 1806 the then independent German monarchies, such as Bavaria, Württemberg and Lippe could create their own nobility, including  (although the Elector of Brandenburg had, as king of the originally exclusively extraterritorial Prussia even before that date, arrogated to himself the prerogative of ennoblement). Some of the older baronial families began to use  in formal contexts to distinguish themselves from the new classes of barons created by monarchs of lesser stature than the Holy Roman Emperors, and this usage is far from obsolete.

Function

Prior to abolition of nobility

The inheritance of titles of nobility in most German-speaking areas was not restricted by primogeniture as is the baronial title in Britain. Both titles are translated in English as "Baroness".

In Prussia and some other countries in northern Europe, the title of Freiherr was, as long as the monarchy existed, usually used preceding a person's given name (e.g. ). In Austria-Hungary and Bavaria, however, it would be inserted between the given name and the family name (e.g. ).

Since abolition of nobility
After the First World War, the monarchies were abolished in most German-speaking areas of Europe, and the nobility lost recognition as a legal class in the newly created republics of Germany and Austria.

In Austria
The public use of such titles was and still is prohibited, and violations could be fined.

In practice, however, former noble titles are still used socially in Austria; some people consider it a matter of courtesy to use them.

In 2003, the Constitutional Court ruled that an Austrian woman having been adopted by a German carrying an aristocratic title as part of his name is not allowed to carry this title in her name. The Federal Administrative Court in a similar case asked the European Court of Justice whether this Austrian regulation would violate the right of the European Union; the European Court of Justice did not object to the Austrian decision not to accept the words  as part of an Austrian woman's name.

In Germany
The German republic, under Article 109 of the Weimar Constitution of 1919, legally transformed all hereditary noble titles into dependent parts of the legal surname. The former title thus became a part of the family name, and moved in front of the family name. , as a German citizen, therefore became . Female forms of titles have been legally accepted as a variation in the surname after 1919 by a still valid decision of the former German High Court.

Parallel titles
Similar titles have been seen in parts of Europe that have historically been dominated by Germany (in the cultural sense): the Baltic States, Austria–Hungary, Sweden, Finland and to some extent in Denmark–Norway.

Swedish and Danish–Norwegian title
From the Middle Ages onward, each head of a Swedish noble house was entitled to vote in any provincial council when held, as in the Realm's , later . In 1561, King Eric XIV began to grant some noblemen the titles of count or baron.

However, after the change of constitution in 1809, newly created baronships in principle conferred the dignity only in primogeniture. In the now valid Swedish Instrument of Government (1974), the possibility to create nobility is completely eliminated; and since the beginning of the twenty-first century, noble dignities have passed from the official sphere to the private.

It was instituted on 25 May 1671 with Christian V's  privileges. With the first free Constitution of Denmark of 1849 came a complete abolition of the privileges of the nobility. Today titles are only of ceremonial interest in the circles around the Monarchy of Denmark

Finnish title
This prerogative was confirmed in the constitutional arrangements of 1625. The Finnish nobility shares most of its origins with Swedish nobility. In the beginning, they were all without honorific titulature, and known just as "lords". In subsequent centuries, while Finland remained an autonomous grand duchy, many families were raised in rank as counts, s, or as untitled nobles. Theoretically, all created  families were given a barony (with some rights of taxation and jurisprudence), but such fiefs were only granted in the 16th and 17th centuries. Their property tax exemption continued into the 20th century, being, however, diminished substantially by reforms of the 19th century.

See also
 Imperial Knight
 Boyar

Notes

References

External links
 Nobility FAQ

Austrian noble titles
German noble titles
Swedish noble titles
Barons of Austria
Barons of the Holy Roman Empire
Barons of Germany